St. Mary's Matriculation Higher Secondary School, is a school in Cuddalore, Tamil Nadu, India. The school follows Matriculation unit system for its curriculum.

Sr. Maria is the Principal and Sr. Ludovic is the correspondent.

History
St. Mary's Matriculation Higher Secondary School is a Catholic Institution meant primarily for Catholics but open to students of other faith, with special reference to the poor, established by the Congregation of the Sisters of ST. Joseph of Cluny, which had its headquarters at Trichy. It is owned by the Educational Institute of the Sisters of St. Joseph of Cluny, Cuddalore – a body registered under the Societies Registration Act, 1860 and having its Registered Office at Cuddalore.

Blessed ANNE MARIE JAVOUHEY (1770-1851), urged by the desire to seek, find and accomplish the will of God founded the Congregation of the Sisters of St. Joseph of Cluny, in Cluny (France) under the patronage of St. Joseph. In fulfilling the will of God revealed to her by special intervention to God, she went beyond the boundaries of France to Africa and Mana (South America). At Mana, she was the pioneer for the liberation of African slaves (apartheid). Her daughters scattered over the five continents, imbued with the same zeal, carried on her mission in the social, medical and educational field.

In 1827, the first three Cluny sisters came to Pondicherry. They were followed, three years later, by Mother Rosalie Javouhey, Anne Marie's youngest sister. In accordance with the spirit of the Founders, they launched out into social, medical and educational fields. To impart sound moral, spiritual, human and social values to the students; for life, and to prepare them for their respective roles in society; schools were established.

In the year 1907, St. Mary's Home (Convent) was established and later, to fulfill the needs of the destitute in and around Cuddalore, a home for the aged was established. Realizing the need of the hour and in line with Anne Marie's vision, later St. Mary's school was established in the year 1914.

Motto
Higher & Higher

Co-curricular and Extra-curricular
1. Bul Buls - Std. III & V 
2. Guides - Std. VI to XI 
3. Junior Red Cross - Std. VI to VIII 
4. Interact Club - Std. IX 
5. Joyful Vanguards -Std.XI 
6. Nanette Club - Std. VIII 
7. Yoga - Std. III to IX 
8. National Green Corps - Std. VIII 
9. Red Ribbon - Std. XI 
10. Y.C.S. - Std. VII to IX 
11. N.S.S. - Std. XI

House System
Students are allotted to one of the four houses. The four houses are :  
 Sapphire-Serve with Smile
 Topaz -Toil to Triumph
 Amethyst -Aspire to Achieve
 Rubies -Ready to do the right

Events
The school celebrated its centenary anniversary in 2014.

 

Primary schools in Tamil Nadu
High schools and secondary schools in Tamil Nadu
Christian schools in Tamil Nadu
Education in Cuddalore district
Educational institutions established in 1914
1914 establishments in India
Catholic secondary schools in India
Cuddalore